Santiago Ontañón (1903–1989) was a Spanish actor and art director, designing the sets for a number of film productions. His sister Sara Ontañón was a film editor. He was a friend of director Luis Buñuel.

Selected filmography

Actor

 El embrujo de Sevilla (1931)
 La traviesa molinera (1934) - The Miller
 Por un perro chico, una mujer (1934)
 A Woman in Danger (1936) - Ricardo
 Faustina (1957) - Don Fernando
 Muchachas en vacaciones (1958)
 La vida por delante (1958) - Paciente 'Sra. de Anglada'
 Juego de niños (1959)
 Miss Cuplé (1969)
 La vida alrededor (1959) - Socio
 El día de los enamorados (1959) - Jugador de Golf
 Carnival Day (1960)
 Amor bajo cero (1960) - Contraalmirante
 Sólo para hombres (1960)
 Mi calle (1960)
 The Red Rose (1960)
 Adiós, Mimí Pompón (1961) - (uncredited)
 Ha llegado un ángel (1961) - Productor
 Julia y el celacanto (1961)
 El pobre García (1961)
 Siempre es domingo (1961)
 Honorables sinvergüenzas (1961)
 Tómbola (1962) - Consejero de seguros
 La gran familia (1962)
 The Executioner (1963) - Sr. Corcuera, el académico 
 The Adventures of Scaramouche (1963)
 The Black Tulip (1964)
 Los dinamiteros (1964) - Conserje
 Búsqueme a esa chica (1964)
 Rueda de sospechosos (1964) - Don Pablo
 The Hell of Manitoba (1965) - Bankier
 La familia y... uno más (1965)
 Cotolay (1965) - Abad
 El arte de no casarse (1966)
 Tres perros locos, locos (1966)
 De cuerpo presente (1967)
 Crimen imperfecto (1970) - Invitado ebrio
 Variety (1971) - Decorador
 Blanca por fuera y Rosa por dentro (1971) - Don Félix
 Dans la poussière du soleil (1972) - Le banquier (uncredited)
 Las señoritas de mala compañía (1973) - Don Faustino (uncredited)
 Hold-Up, instantánea de una corrupción (1974)
 No quiero perder la honra (1975)
 La muerte ronda a Mónica (1976)
 Impossible Love (1977) - Hombre rico
 Secretos de alcoba (1977)
 Mi hija Hildegart (1977)
 Cinco tenedores (1980) - Los Monteros (final film role)

Art director
 The Moorish Queen (1937)
 The Black Tulip (1964)
 Run Like a Thief (1967)
 The Castle of Fu Manchu (1969)

References

Bibliography 
 Román Gubern & Paul Hammond. Luis Buñuel: The Red Years, 1929–1939. University of Wisconsin Pres, 2012.

External links 
 

1903 births
1989 deaths
Spanish male film actors
Spanish art directors
People from Santander, Spain